Calling the World is the second studio album by American alternative rock band Rooney.  It was released on July 17, 2007.

The album is the result of almost three years of recording, with over 50 songs recorded during the sessions. "When Did Your Heart Go Missing?", was released as the lead single. The album was produced by John "Strawberry" Fields. Rooney unveiled tracks from the album at a series of Monday night concerts in Los Angeles during March. The cover is a recreation of the cover to the self-titled debut album of classic rock band The Doors and an homage to Rubber Soul by the classic rock band The Beatles. Alternative artwork was used on the album's European release.

Following its release, Calling the World debuted at number 42 on the U.S. Billboard 200, selling about 15,000 copies in its first week. A second single "I Should've Been After You" was released later in the year, while a third single, "Are You Afraid" was released in some countries early in 2008.

Track listing
All songs written and composed by Robert Coppola Schwartzman.
"Calling the World" – 3:02
"When Did Your Heart Go Missing?" – 3:31
"I Should've Been After You" – 4:23
"Tell Me Soon" – 3:19
"Don't Come Around Again" – 4:01
"Are You Afraid?" – 4:11
"Love Me or Leave Me" – 3:12
"Paralyzed" – 2:34
"What For" – 3:43
"All in Your Head" – 3:43
"Believe in Me" – 4:02
"Help Me Find My Way" – 4:12

The album came with bonus songs depending on where it was purchased:
Best Buy - "Get Away"
iTunes - "Sleep Song"
Target - "Jump in My Bed"
UK bonus tracks - "Jump in My Bed" and "Get Away"
Japan bonus tracks - all of the above

Personnel

Rooney
Robert Schwartzman - lead vocals, rhythm guitar, producer
Taylor Locke - lead guitar, backing vocals
Matthew Winter - bass guitar
Ned Brower - drums, backing vocals
Louie Stephens - keyboards, piano

Additional musicians
 Richard Dodd - cello (tracks 4, 11)
 Leah Katz - viola (tracks 4, 11)
 Daphne Chen - violin (tracks 4, 11)
 Eric Gorfain - violin (tracks 4, 11)
 The Section Quartet - strings (tracks 4, 11)
 Dhani Harrison - additional vocals (track 1)
 Andy Sturmer - additional vocals (track 3)
 Ducky Carlisle - tambourine (track 5)
 Stephen Lu - string arrangement (tracks 1,4)

Production
 John Fields – producer, recording, mixing
 Ross Hogarth - engineer
 Ted Jensen - mastering
 Alyssa Pittaluga - assistant engineer
 Andrew Lynch - assistant engineer
 Atom - assistant engineer
 Mike Laza - assistant engineer
 Sara Killion - assistant engineer
 Scott Elgin - assistant engineer
 Steven Miller - additional recording 
 Woody Jackson - additional recording 
 Dorian "Wook" Crozier - drum tech
 Mike Fasano - drum tech
 Kevin Dobski – management 
 Robert Hayes - management 
 Martin Kierszenbaum - A&R
 Autumn de Wilde - photography
 Meeno - photography
 Sasha Eisenman - photography
 Janée Meadows – art direction, design

References

2007 albums
Rooney (band) albums
Geffen Records albums
Albums produced by John Fields (record producer)